Alzheimer's disease (AD) is a neurodegenerative disease that usually starts slowly and progressively worsens. It is the cause of 60–70% of cases of dementia. The most common early symptom is difficulty in remembering recent events. As the disease advances, symptoms can include problems with language, disorientation (including easily getting lost), mood swings, loss of motivation, self-neglect, and behavioral issues. As a person's condition declines, they often withdraw from family and society. Gradually, bodily functions are lost, ultimately leading to death. Although the speed of progression can vary, the typical life expectancy following diagnosis is three to nine years.

The cause of Alzheimer's disease is poorly understood. There are many environmental and genetic risk factors associated with its development. The strongest genetic risk factor is from an allele of APOE. Other risk factors include a history of head injury, clinical depression, and high blood pressure. The disease process is largely associated with amyloid plaques, neurofibrillary tangles, and loss of neuronal connections in the brain. A probable diagnosis is based on the history of the illness and cognitive testing with medical imaging and blood tests to rule out other possible causes. Initial symptoms are often mistaken for normal brain aging. Examination of brain tissue is needed for a definite diagnosis, but this can only take place after death. Good nutrition, physical activity, and engaging socially are known to be of benefit generally in aging, and these may help in reducing the risk of cognitive decline and Alzheimer's; in 2019 clinical trials were underway to look at these possibilities. There are no medications or supplements that have been shown to decrease risk.

No treatments stop or reverse its progression, though some may temporarily improve symptoms. Affected people increasingly rely on others for assistance, often placing a burden on the caregiver. The pressures can include social, psychological, physical, and economic elements. Exercise programs may be beneficial with respect to activities of daily living and can potentially improve outcomes. Behavioral problems or psychosis due to dementia are often treated with antipsychotics, but this is not usually recommended, as there is little benefit and an increased risk of early death.

As of 2020, there were approximately 50 million people worldwide with Alzheimer's disease. It most often begins in people over 65 years of age, although up to 10% of cases are early-onset affecting those in their 30s to mid-60s. It affects about 6% of people 65 years and older, and women more often than men. The disease is named after German psychiatrist and pathologist Alois Alzheimer, who first described it in 1906. Alzheimer's financial burden on society is large, with an estimated global annual cost of trillion. Alzheimer's disease is currently ranked as the seventh leading cause of death in the United States.

Signs and symptoms
The course of Alzheimer's is generally described in three stages, with a progressive pattern of cognitive and functional impairment. The three stages are described as early or mild, middle or moderate, and late or severe. The disease is known to target the hippocampus which is associated with memory, and this is responsible for the first symptoms of memory impairment. As the disease progresses so does the degree of memory impairment.

First symptoms

The first symptoms are often mistakenly attributed to aging or stress. Detailed neuropsychological testing can reveal mild cognitive difficulties up to eight years before a person fulfills the clinical criteria for diagnosis of Alzheimer's disease. These early symptoms can affect the most complex activities of daily living. The most noticeable deficit is short term memory loss, which shows up as difficulty in remembering recently learned facts and inability to acquire new information.

Subtle problems with the executive functions of attentiveness, planning, flexibility, and abstract thinking, or impairments in semantic memory (memory of meanings, and concept relationships) can also be symptomatic of the early stages of Alzheimer's disease. Apathy and depression can be seen at this stage, with apathy remaining as the most persistent symptom throughout the course of the disease. Mild cognitive impairment (MCI) is often found to be a transitional stage between normal aging and dementia. MCI can present with a variety of symptoms, and when memory loss is the predominant symptom, it is termed amnestic MCI and is frequently seen as a prodromal stage of Alzheimer's disease. Amnestic MCI has a greater than 90% likelihood of being associated with Alzheimer's.

Early stage
In people with Alzheimer's disease, the increasing impairment of learning and memory eventually leads to a definitive diagnosis. In a small percentage, difficulties with language, executive functions, perception (agnosia), or execution of movements (apraxia) are more prominent than memory problems. Alzheimer's disease does not affect all memory capacities equally. Older memories of the person's life (episodic memory), facts learned (semantic memory), and implicit memory (the memory of the body on how to do things, such as using a fork to eat or how to drink from a glass) are affected to a lesser degree than new facts or memories.

Language problems are mainly characterised by a shrinking vocabulary and decreased word fluency, leading to a general impoverishment of oral and written language. In this stage, the person with Alzheimer's is usually capable of communicating basic ideas adequately. While performing fine motor tasks such as writing, drawing, or dressing, certain movement coordination and planning difficulties (apraxia) may be present, but they are commonly unnoticed. As the disease progresses, people with Alzheimer's disease can often continue to perform many tasks independently, but may need assistance or supervision with the most cognitively demanding activities.

Middle stage
Progressive deterioration eventually hinders independence, with subjects being unable to perform most common activities of daily living. Speech difficulties become evident due to an inability to recall vocabulary, which leads to frequent incorrect word substitutions (paraphasias). Reading and writing skills are also progressively lost. Complex motor sequences become less coordinated as time passes and Alzheimer's disease progresses, so the risk of falling increases. During this phase, memory problems worsen, and the person may fail to recognise close relatives. Long-term memory, which was previously intact, becomes impaired.

Behavioral and neuropsychiatric changes become more prevalent. Common manifestations are wandering, irritability and emotional lability, leading to crying, outbursts of unpremeditated aggression, or resistance to caregiving. Sundowning can also appear. Approximately 30% of people with Alzheimer's disease develop illusionary misidentifications and other delusional symptoms. Subjects also lose insight of their disease process and limitations (anosognosia). Urinary incontinence can develop. These symptoms create stress for relatives and caregivers, which can be reduced by moving the person from home care to other long-term care facilities.

Late stage

During the final stage, known as the late-stage or severe stage, there is complete dependence on caregivers. Language is reduced to simple phrases or even single words, eventually leading to complete loss of speech. Despite the loss of verbal language abilities, people can often understand and return emotional signals. Although aggressiveness can still be present, extreme apathy and exhaustion are much more common symptoms. People with Alzheimer's disease will ultimately not be able to perform even the simplest tasks independently; muscle mass and mobility deteriorates to the point where they are bedridden and unable to feed themselves. The cause of death is usually an external factor, such as infection of pressure ulcers or pneumonia, not the disease itself.

Familial and nonfamilial Alzheimer's disease
 
Familial Alzheimer's disease is an inherited and uncommon form of Alzheimer's disease. Familial AD usually strikes earlier in life, defined as before the age of 65. FAD usually implies multiple persons affected in one or more generation. Sporadic Alzheimer's disease (or Nonfamilial Alzheimer's disease) describes all other cases, where genetic risk factors are minor or unclear.

Causes

Proteins fail to function normally. This disrupts the work of the brain cells affected and triggers a toxic cascade, ultimately leading to cell death and later brain shrinkage.

Alzheimer's disease is believed to occur when abnormal amounts of amyloid beta (Aβ), accumulating extracellularly as amyloid plaques and tau proteins, or intracellularly as neurofibrillary tangles, form in the brain, affecting neuronal functioning and connectivity, resulting in a progressive loss of brain function. This altered protein clearance ability is age-related, regulated by brain cholesterol, and associated with other neurodegenerative diseases.

Advances in brain imaging techniques allow researchers to see the development and spread of abnormal amyloid and tau proteins in the living brain, as well as changes in brain structure and function. Beta-amyloid is a fragment of a larger protein. When these fragments cluster together, a toxic effect appears on neurons  and disrupt cell-to-cell communication. Larger deposits called amyloid plaques are thus further formed.

Tau proteins are responsible in neuron's internal support and transport system to carry nutrients and other essential materials. In Alzheimer's disease, the shape of tau proteins is altered and thus organize themselves into structures called neurofibrillary tangles. The tangles disrupt the transport system and are toxic to cells.

The cause for most Alzheimer's cases is still mostly unknown, except for 1–2% of cases where deterministic genetic differences have been identified. Several competing hypotheses attempt to explain the underlying cause; the two predominant hypotheses are the amyloid beta (Aβ) hypothesis and the cholinergic hypothesis.

The oldest hypothesis, on which most drug therapies are based, is the cholinergic hypothesis, which proposes that Alzheimer's disease is caused by reduced synthesis of the neurotransmitter acetylcholine. The loss of cholinergic neurons noted in the limbic system and cerebral cortex, is a key feature in the progression of Alzheimer's. The 1991 amyloid hypothesis postulated that extracellular amyloid beta (Aβ) deposits are the fundamental cause of the disease. Support for this postulate comes from the location of the gene for the amyloid precursor protein (APP) on chromosome 21, together with the fact that people with trisomy 21 (Down syndrome) who have an extra gene copy almost universally exhibit at least the earliest symptoms of Alzheimer's disease by 40 years of age. A specific isoform of apolipoprotein, APOE4, is a major genetic risk factor for Alzheimer's disease. While apolipoproteins enhance the breakdown of beta amyloid, some isoforms are not very effective at this task (such as APOE4), leading to excess amyloid buildup in the brain.

Genetic
Only 1–2% of Alzheimer's cases are inherited (autosomal dominant). These types are known as early onset familial Alzheimer's disease, can have a very early onset, and a faster rate of progression. Early onset familial Alzheimer's disease can be attributed to mutations in one of three genes: those encoding amyloid-beta precursor protein (APP) and presenilins PSEN1 and PSEN2. Most mutations in the APP and presenilin genes increase the production of a small protein called amyloid beta (Aβ)42, which is the main component of amyloid plaques. Some of the mutations merely alter the ratio between Aβ42 and the other major forms—particularly Aβ40—without increasing Aβ42 levels. Two other genes associated with autosomal dominant Alzheimer's disease are ABCA7 and SORL1.

Most cases of Alzheimer's are not inherited and are termed sporadic Alzheimer's disease, in which environmental and genetic differences may act as risk factors. Most cases of sporadic Alzheimer's disease in contrast to familial Alzheimer's disease are late-onset Alzheimer's disease (LOAD) developing after the age of 65 years. Less than 5% of sporadic Alzheimer's disease have an earlier onset. The strongest genetic risk factor for sporadic Alzheimer's disease is APOEε4. APOEε4 is one of four alleles of apolipoprotein E (APOE). APOE plays a major role in lipid-binding proteins in lipoprotein particles and the epsilon4 allele disrupts this function. Between 40 and 80% of people with Alzheimer's disease possess at least one APOEε4 allele. The APOEε4 allele increases the risk of the disease by three times in heterozygotes and by 15 times in homozygotes. Like many human diseases, environmental effects and genetic modifiers result in incomplete penetrance. For example, certain Nigerian populations do not show the relationship between dose of APOEε4 and incidence or age-of-onset for Alzheimer's disease seen in other human populations.

Alleles in the TREM2 gene have been associated with a 3 to 5 times higher risk of developing Alzheimer's disease.

A Japanese pedigree of familial Alzheimer's disease was found to be associated with a deletion mutation of codon 693 of APP. This mutation and its association with Alzheimer's disease was first reported in 2008, and is known as the Osaka mutation. Only homozygotes with this mutation have an increased risk of developing Alzheimer's disease. This mutation accelerates Aβ oligomerization but the proteins do not form the amyloid fibrils that aggregate into amyloid plaques, suggesting that it is the Aβ oligomerization rather than the fibrils that may be the cause of this disease. Mice expressing this mutation have all the usual pathologies of Alzheimer's disease.

Other hypotheses

The tau hypothesis proposes that tau protein abnormalities initiate the disease cascade. In this model, hyperphosphorylated tau begins to pair with other threads of tau as paired helical filaments. Eventually, they form neurofibrillary tangles inside nerve cell bodies. When this occurs, the microtubules disintegrate, destroying the structure of the cell's cytoskeleton which collapses the neuron's transport system.

A number of studies connect the misfolded amyloid beta and tau proteins associated with the pathology of Alzheimer's disease, as bringing about oxidative stress that leads to chronic inflammation. Sustained inflammation (neuroinflammation) is also a feature of other neurodegenerative diseases including Parkinson's disease, and ALS. Spirochete infections have also been linked to dementia.  DNA damages accumulate in AD brains; reactive oxygen species may be the major source of this DNA damage.

Sleep disturbances are seen as a possible risk factor for inflammation in Alzheimer's disease. Sleep problems have been seen as a consequence of Alzheimer's disease but studies suggest that they may instead be a causal factor. Sleep disturbances are thought to be linked to persistent inflammation. The cellular homeostasis of biometals such as ionic copper, iron, and zinc is disrupted in Alzheimer's disease, though it remains unclear whether this is produced by or causes the changes in proteins. Smoking is a significant Alzheimer's disease risk factor. Systemic markers of the innate immune system are risk factors for late-onset Alzheimer's disease. Exposure to air pollution may be a contributing factor to the development of Alzheimer's disease.

According to one theory, dysfunction of oligodendrocytes and their associated myelin during aging contributes to axon damage, which in turn generates in amyloid production and tau hyper-phosphorylation.

Retrogenesis is a medical hypothesis that just as the fetus goes through a process of neurodevelopment beginning with neurulation and ending with myelination, the brains of people with Alzheimer's disease go through a reverse neurodegeneration process starting with demyelination and death of axons (white matter) and ending with the death of grey matter. Likewise the hypothesis is, that as infants go through states of cognitive development, people with Alzheimer's disease go through the reverse process of progressive cognitive impairment.

The association with celiac disease is unclear, with a 2019 study finding no increase in dementia overall in those with CD, while a 2018 review found an association with several types of dementia including Alzheimer's disease.

Pathophysiology

Neuropathology

Alzheimer's disease is characterised by loss of neurons and synapses in the cerebral cortex and certain subcortical regions. This loss results in gross atrophy of the affected regions, including degeneration in the temporal lobe and parietal lobe, and parts of the frontal cortex and cingulate gyrus. Degeneration is also present in brainstem nuclei particularly the locus coeruleus in the pons. Studies using MRI and PET have documented reductions in the size of specific brain regions in people with Alzheimer's disease as they progressed from mild cognitive impairment to Alzheimer's disease, and in comparison with similar images from healthy older adults.

Both Aβ plaques and neurofibrillary tangles are clearly visible by microscopy in brains of those with Alzheimer's disease, especially in the hippocampus. However, Alzheimer's disease may occur without neurofibrillary tangles in the neocortex. Plaques are dense, mostly insoluble deposits of beta-amyloid peptide and cellular material outside and around neurons. Tangles (neurofibrillary tangles) are aggregates of the microtubule-associated protein tau which has become hyperphosphorylated and accumulate inside the cells themselves. Although many older individuals develop some plaques and tangles as a consequence of aging, the brains of people with Alzheimer's disease have a greater number of them in specific brain regions such as the temporal lobe. Lewy bodies are not rare in the brains of people with Alzheimer's disease.

Biochemistry

Alzheimer's disease has been identified as a protein misfolding disease, a proteopathy, caused by the accumulation of abnormally folded amyloid beta protein into amyloid plaques,  and tau protein into neurofibrillary tangles in the brain. Plaques are made up of small peptides, 39–43 amino acids in length, called amyloid beta (Aβ). Amyloid beta is a fragment from the larger amyloid-beta precursor protein (APP) a transmembrane protein that penetrates the neuron's membrane. APP is critical to neuron growth, survival, and post-injury repair. In Alzheimer's disease, gamma secretase and beta secretase act together in a proteolytic process which causes APP to be divided into smaller fragments. One of these fragments gives rise to fibrils of amyloid beta, which then form clumps that deposit outside neurons in dense formations known as amyloid plaques.

Alzheimer's disease is also considered a tauopathy due to abnormal aggregation of the tau protein. Every neuron has a cytoskeleton, an internal support structure partly made up of structures called microtubules. These microtubules act like tracks, guiding nutrients and molecules from the body of the cell to the ends of the axon and back. A protein called tau stabilises the microtubules when phosphorylated, and is therefore called a microtubule-associated protein. In Alzheimer's disease, tau undergoes chemical changes, becoming hyperphosphorylated; it then begins to pair with other threads, creating neurofibrillary tangles and disintegrating the neuron's transport system. Pathogenic tau can also cause neuronal death through transposable element dysregulation.

Disease mechanism
Exactly how disturbances of production and aggregation of the beta-amyloid peptide give rise to the pathology of Alzheimer's disease is not known. The amyloid hypothesis traditionally points to the accumulation of beta-amyloid peptides as the central event triggering neuron degeneration. Accumulation of aggregated amyloid fibrils, which are believed to be the toxic form of the protein responsible for disrupting the cell's calcium ion homeostasis, induces programmed cell death (apoptosis). It is also known that Aβ selectively builds up in the mitochondria in the cells of Alzheimer's-affected brains, and it also inhibits certain enzyme functions and the utilisation of glucose by neurons.

Various inflammatory processes and cytokines may also have a role in the pathology of Alzheimer's disease. Inflammation is a general marker of tissue damage in any disease, and may be either secondary to tissue damage in Alzheimer's disease or a marker of an immunological response. There is increasing evidence of a strong interaction between the neurons and the immunological mechanisms in the brain. Obesity and systemic inflammation may interfere with immunological processes which promote disease progression.

Alterations in the distribution of different neurotrophic factors and in the expression of their receptors such as the brain-derived neurotrophic factor (BDNF) have been described in Alzheimer's disease.

Diagnosis

Alzheimer's disease can only be definitively diagnosed with autopsy findings; in the absence of autopsy, clinical diagnoses of AD are "possible" or "probable", based on other findings. Up to 23% of those clinically diagnosed with AD may be misdiagnosed and may have pathology suggestive of another condition with symptoms that mimic those of AD.

AD is usually clinically diagnosed based on the person's medical history, history from relatives, and behavioral observations. The presence of characteristic neurological and neuropsychological features and the absence of alternative conditions supports the diagnosis. Advanced medical imaging with computed tomography (CT) or magnetic resonance imaging (MRI), and with single-photon emission computed tomography (SPECT) or positron emission tomography (PET), can be used to help exclude other cerebral pathology or subtypes of dementia. Moreover, it may predict conversion from prodromal stages (mild cognitive impairment) to Alzheimer's disease. FDA-approved radiopharmaceutical diagnostic agents used in PET for Alzheimer's disease are florbetapir (2012), flutemetamol (2013), florbetaben (2014), and flortaucipir (2020). Because many insurance companies in the United States do not cover this procedure, its use in clinical practice is largely limited to clinical trials .

Assessment of intellectual functioning including memory testing can further characterise the state of the disease. Medical organizations have created diagnostic criteria to ease and standardise the diagnostic process for practising physicians. Definitive diagnosis can only be confirmed with post-mortem evaluations when brain material is available and can be examined histologically for senile plaques and neurofibrillary tangles.

Criteria
There are three sets of criteria for the clinical diagnoses of the spectrum of Alzheimer's disease: the 2013 fifth edition of the Diagnostic and Statistical Manual of Mental Disorders (DSM-5); the National Institute on Aging-Alzheimer's Association (NIA-AA) definition as revised in 2011; and the International Working Group criteria as revised in 2010. Three broad time periods, which can span decades, define the progression of Alzheimer's disease from the preclinical phase, to mild cognitive impairment (MCI), followed by Alzheimer's disease dementia.

Eight intellectual domains are most commonly impaired in AD—memory, language, perceptual skills, attention, motor skills, orientation, problem solving and executive functional abilities, as listed in the fourth text revision of the DSM (DSM-IV-TR).

The DSM-5 defines criteria for probable or possible Alzheimer's for both major and mild neurocognitive disorder. Major or mild neurocognitive disorder must be present along with at least one cognitive deficit for a diagnosis of either probable or possible AD. For major neurocognitive disorder due to Alzheimer's disease, probable Alzheimer's disease can be diagnosed if the individual has genetic evidence of Alzheimer's or if two or more acquired cognitive deficits, and a functional disability that is not from another disorder, are present. Otherwise, possible Alzheimer's disease can be diagnosed as the diagnosis follows an atypical route. For mild neurocognitive disorder due to Alzheimer's, probable Alzheimer's disease can be diagnosed if there is genetic evidence, whereas possible Alzheimer's disease can be met if all of the following are present: no genetic evidence, decline in both learning and memory, two or more cognitive deficits, and a functional disability not from another disorder.

The NIA-AA criteria are used mainly in research rather than in clinical assessments. They define Alzheimer's disease through three major stages: preclinical, mild cognitive impairment (MCI), and Alzheimer's dementia. Diagnosis in the preclinical stage is complex and focuses on asymptomatic individuals; the latter two stages describe individuals experiencing symptoms. The core clinical criteria for MCI is used along with identification of biomarkers, predominantly those for neuronal injury (mainly tau-related) and amyloid beta deposition. The core clinical criteria itself rests on the presence of cognitive impairment without the presence of comorbidities. The third stage is divided into probable and possible Alzheimer's disease dementia. In probable Alzheimer's disease dementia there is steady impairment of cognition over time and a memory-related or non-memory-related cognitive dysfunction. In possible Alzheimer's disease dementia, another causal disease such as cerebrovascular disease is present.

Techniques

Neuropsychological tests including cognitive tests such as the Mini–Mental State Examination (MMSE), the Montreal Cognitive Assessment (MoCA) and the Mini-Cog are widely used to aid in diagnosis of the cognitive impairments in AD. These tests may not always be accurate, as they lack sensitivity to mild cognitive impairment, and can be biased by language or attention problems; more comprehensive test arrays are necessary for high reliability of results, particularly in the earliest stages of the disease.

Further neurological examinations are crucial in the differential diagnosis of Alzheimer's disease and other diseases. Interviews with family members are used in assessment; caregivers can supply important information on daily living abilities and on the decrease in the person's mental function. A caregiver's viewpoint is particularly important, since a person with Alzheimer's disease is commonly unaware of their deficits. Many times, families have difficulties in the detection of initial dementia symptoms and may not communicate accurate information to a physician.

Supplemental testing can rule out other potentially treatable diagnoses and help avoid misdiagnoses. Common supplemental tests include blood tests, thyroid function tests, as well as tests to assess vitamin B12 levels, rule out neurosyphilis and rule out metabolic problems (including tests for kidney function, electrolyte levels and for diabetes). MRI or CT scans might also be used to rule out other potential causes of the symptoms – including tumors or strokes.  Delirium and depression can be common among individuals and are important to rule out.

Psychological tests for depression are used, since depression can either be concurrent with Alzheimer's disease (see Depression of Alzheimer disease), an early sign of cognitive impairment, or even the cause.

Due to low accuracy, the C-PIB-PET scan is not recommended as an early diagnostic tool or for predicting the development of Alzheimer's disease when people show signs of mild cognitive impairment (MCI). The use of 18F-FDG PET scans, as a single test, to identify people who may develop Alzheimer's disease is not supported by evidence.

Prevention

There are no disease-modifying treatments available to cure Alzheimer's disease and because of this, AD research has focused on interventions to prevent the onset and progression. There is no evidence that supports any particular measure in preventing Alzheimer's, and studies of measures to prevent the onset or progression have produced inconsistent results. Epidemiological studies have proposed relationships between an individual's likelihood of developing AD and modifiable factors, such as medications, lifestyle, and diet. There are some challenges in determining whether interventions for Alzheimer's disease act as a primary prevention method, preventing the disease itself, or a secondary prevention method, identifying the early stages of the disease.  These challenges include duration of intervention, different stages of disease at which intervention begins, and lack of standardization of inclusion criteria regarding biomarkers specific for Alzheimer's disease. Further research is needed to determine factors that can help prevent Alzheimer's disease.

Medication
Cardiovascular risk factors, such as hypercholesterolaemia, hypertension, diabetes, and smoking, are associated with a higher risk of onset and worsened course of AD. The use of statins to lower cholesterol may be of benefit in Alzheimer's. Antihypertensive and antidiabetic medications in individuals without overt cognitive impairment may decrease the risk of dementia by influencing cerebrovascular pathology. More research is needed to examine the relationship with Alzheimer's disease specifically; clarification of the direct role medications play versus other concurrent lifestyle changes (diet, exercise, smoking) is needed.

Depression is associated with an increased risk for Alzheimer's disease; management with antidepressants may provide a preventative measure.

Historically, long-term usage of non-steroidal anti-inflammatory drugs (NSAIDs) were thought to be associated with a reduced likelihood of developing Alzheimer's disease as it reduces inflammation; however, NSAIDs do not appear to be useful as a treatment. Additionally, because women have a higher incidence of Alzheimer's disease than men, it was once thought that estrogen deficiency during menopause was a risk factor. However, there is a lack of evidence to show that hormone replacement therapy (HRT) in menopause decreases risk of cognitive decline.

Lifestyle

Certain lifestyle activities, such as physical and cognitive exercises, higher education and occupational attainment, cigarette smoking, stress, sleep, and the management of other comorbidities, including diabetes and hypertension, may affect the risk of developing Alzheimer's.

Physical exercise is associated with a decreased rate of dementia, and is effective in reducing symptom severity in those with AD. Memory and cognitive functions can be improved with aerobic exercises including brisk walking three times weekly for forty minutes. It may also induce neuroplasticity of the brain. Participating in mental exercises, such as reading, crossword puzzles, and chess have shown a potential to be preventative. Meeting the WHO recommendations for physical activity is associated with a lower risk of AD.

Higher education and occupational attainment, and participation in leisure activities, contribute to a reduced risk of developing Alzheimer's, or of delaying the onset of symptoms. This is compatible with the cognitive reserve theory, which states that some life experiences result in more efficient neural functioning providing the individual a cognitive reserve that delays the onset of dementia manifestations. Education delays the onset of Alzheimer's disease syndrome without changing the duration of the disease.

Cessation in smoking may reduce risk of developing Alzheimer's' disease, specifically in those who carry APOE ɛ4 allele. The increased oxidative stress caused by smoking results in downstream inflammatory or neurodegenerative processes that may increase risk of developing AD. Avoidance of smoking, counseling and pharmacotherapies to quit smoking are used, and avoidance of environmental tobacco smoke is recommended.

Alzheimer's disease is associated with sleep disorders but the precise relationship is unclear. It was once thought that as people get older, the risk of developing sleep disorders and AD independently increase, but research is examining whether sleep disorders may increase the prevalence of AD. One theory is that the mechanisms to increase clearance of toxic substances, including Aβ, are active during sleep. With decreased sleep, a person is increasing Aβ production and decreasing Aβ clearance, resulting in Aβ accumulation. Receiving adequate sleep (approximately 7–8 hours) every night has become a potential lifestyle intervention to prevent the development of AD.

Stress is a risk factor for the development of Alzheimer's. The mechanism by which stress predisposes someone to development of Alzheimer's is unclear, but it is suggested that lifetime stressors may affect a person's epigenome, leading to an overexpression or under expression of specific genes. Although the relationship of stress and Alzheimer's is unclear, strategies to reduce stress and relax the mind may be helpful strategies in preventing the progression or Alzheimer's disease. Meditation, for instance,  is a helpful lifestyle change to support cognition and well-being, though further research is needed to assess long-term effects.

Management
There is no cure for Alzheimer's disease; available treatments offer relatively small symptomatic benefits but remain palliative in nature. Treatments can be divided into pharmaceutical, psychosocial, and caregiving.

Pharmaceutical

Medications used to treat the cognitive problems of Alzheimer's disease include: four acetylcholinesterase inhibitors (tacrine, rivastigmine, galantamine, and donepezil) and memantine, an NMDA receptor antagonist. The acetylcholinesterase inhibitors are intended for those with mild to severe Alzheimer's, whereas memantine is intended for those with moderate or severe Alzheimer's disease. The benefit from their use is small.

Reduction in the activity of the cholinergic neurons is a well-known feature of Alzheimer's disease. Acetylcholinesterase inhibitors are employed to reduce the rate at which acetylcholine (ACh) is broken down, thereby increasing the concentration of ACh in the brain and combating the loss of ACh caused by the death of cholinergic neurons. There is evidence for the efficacy of these medications in mild to moderate Alzheimer's disease, and some evidence for their use in the advanced stage. The use of these drugs in mild cognitive impairment has not shown any effect in a delay of the onset of Alzheimer's disease. The most common side effects are nausea and vomiting, both of which are linked to cholinergic excess. These side effects arise in approximately 10–20% of users, are mild to moderate in severity, and can be managed by slowly adjusting medication doses. Less common secondary effects include muscle cramps, decreased heart rate (bradycardia), decreased appetite and weight, and increased gastric acid production.

Glutamate is an excitatory neurotransmitter of the nervous system, although excessive amounts in the brain can lead to cell death through a process called excitotoxicity which consists of the overstimulation of glutamate receptors. Excitotoxicity occurs not only in Alzheimer's disease, but also in other neurological diseases such as Parkinson's disease and multiple sclerosis. Memantine is a noncompetitive NMDA receptor antagonist first used as an anti-influenza agent. It acts on the glutamatergic system by blocking NMDA receptors and inhibiting their overstimulation by glutamate. Memantine has been shown to have a small benefit in the treatment of moderate to severe Alzheimer's disease. Reported adverse events with memantine are infrequent and mild, including hallucinations, confusion, dizziness, headache and fatigue. The combination of memantine and donepezil has been shown to be "of statistically significant but clinically marginal effectiveness".

An extract of Ginkgo biloba known as EGb 761 has been used for treating Alzheimer's and other neuropsychiatric disorders. Its use is approved throughout Europe. The World Federation of Biological Psychiatry guidelines lists EGb 761 with the same weight of evidence (level B) given to acetylcholinesterase inhibitors and memantine. EGb 761 is the only one that showed improvement of symptoms in both Alzheimer's disease and vascular dementia. EGb 761 may have a role either on its own or as an add-on if other therapies prove ineffective. A 2016 review concluded that the quality of evidence from clinical trials on Ginkgo biloba has been insufficient to warrant its use for treating Alzheimer's disease.

Atypical antipsychotics are modestly useful in reducing aggression and psychosis in people with Alzheimer's disease, but their advantages are offset by serious adverse effects, such as stroke, movement difficulties or cognitive decline. When used in the long-term, they have been shown to associate with increased mortality. Stopping antipsychotic use in this group of people appears to be safe.

Psychosocial
Psychosocial interventions are used as an adjunct to pharmaceutical treatment and can be classified within behavior-, emotion-, cognition- or stimulation-oriented approaches.

Behavioral interventions attempt to identify and reduce the antecedents and consequences of problem behaviors. This approach has not shown success in improving overall functioning, but can help to reduce some specific problem behaviors, such as incontinence. There is a lack of high quality data on the effectiveness of these techniques in other behavior problems such as wandering. Music therapy is effective in reducing behavioral and psychological symptoms.

Emotion-oriented interventions include reminiscence therapy, validation therapy, supportive psychotherapy, sensory integration, also called snoezelen, and simulated presence therapy. A Cochrane review has found no evidence that this is effective.  Reminiscence therapy (RT) involves the discussion of past experiences individually or in group, many times with the aid of photographs, household items, music and sound recordings, or other familiar items from the past. A 2018 review of the effectiveness of RT found that effects were inconsistent, small in size and of doubtful clinical significance, and varied by setting. Simulated presence therapy (SPT) is based on attachment theories and involves playing a recording with voices of the closest relatives of the person with Alzheimer's disease. There is partial evidence indicating that SPT may reduce challenging behaviors.

The aim of cognition-oriented treatments, which include reality orientation and cognitive retraining, is the reduction of cognitive deficits. Reality orientation consists of the presentation of information about time, place, or person to ease the understanding of the person about its surroundings and his or her place in them. On the other hand, cognitive retraining tries to improve impaired capacities by exercising mental abilities. Both have shown some efficacy improving cognitive capacities.

Stimulation-oriented treatments include art, music and pet therapies, exercise, and any other kind of recreational activities. Stimulation has modest support for improving behavior, mood, and, to a lesser extent, function. Nevertheless, as important as these effects are, the main support for the use of stimulation therapies is the change in the person's routine.

Caregiving

Since Alzheimer's has no cure and it gradually renders people incapable of tending to their own needs, caregiving is essentially the treatment and must be carefully managed over the course of the disease.

During the early and moderate stages, modifications to the living environment and lifestyle can increase safety and reduce caretaker burden. Examples of such modifications are the adherence to simplified routines, the placing of safety locks, the labeling of household items to cue the person with the disease or the use of modified daily life objects. If eating becomes problematic, food will need to be prepared in smaller pieces or even puréed. When swallowing difficulties arise, the use of feeding tubes may be required. In such cases, the medical efficacy and ethics of continuing feeding is an important consideration of the caregivers and family members. The use of physical restraints is rarely indicated in any stage of the disease, although there are situations when they are necessary to prevent harm to the person with Alzheimer's disease or their caregivers.

During the final stages of the disease, treatment is centred on relieving discomfort until death, often with the help of hospice.

Diet
Diet may be a modifiable risk factor for the development of Alzheimer's disease. The Mediterranean diet, and the DASH diet are both associated with less cognitive decline. A different approach has been to incorporate elements of both of these diets into one known as the MIND diet. Studies of individual dietary components, minerals and supplements are conflicting as to whether they prevent AD or cognitive decline.

Prognosis

The early stages of Alzheimer's disease are difficult to diagnose. A definitive diagnosis is usually made once cognitive impairment compromises daily living activities, although the person may still be living independently. The symptoms will progress from mild cognitive problems, such as memory loss through increasing stages of cognitive and non-cognitive disturbances, eliminating any possibility of independent living, especially in the late stages of the disease.

Life expectancy of people with Alzheimer's disease is reduced. The normal life expectancy for 60 to 70 years old is 23 to 15 years; for 90 years old it is 4.5 years. Following Alzheimer's disease diagnosis it ranges from 7 to 10 years for those in their 60s and early 70s (a loss of 13 to 8 years), to only about 3 years or less (a loss of 1.5 years) for those in their 90s.

Fewer than 3% of people live more than fourteen years. Disease features significantly associated with reduced survival are an increased severity of cognitive impairment, decreased functional level, history of falls, and disturbances in the neurological examination. Other coincident diseases such as heart problems, diabetes, or history of alcohol abuse are also related with shortened survival. While the earlier the age at onset the higher the total survival years, life expectancy is particularly reduced when compared to the healthy population among those who are younger. Men have a less favourable survival prognosis than women.

Pneumonia and dehydration are the most frequent immediate causes of death brought by Alzheimer's disease, while cancer is a less frequent cause of death than in the general population.

Epidemiology

Two main measures are used in epidemiological studies: incidence and prevalence. Incidence is the number of new cases per unit of person-time at risk (usually number of new cases per thousand person-years); while prevalence is the total number of cases of the disease in the population at any given time.

Regarding incidence, cohort longitudinal studies (studies where a disease-free population is followed over the years) provide rates between 10 and 15 per thousand person-years for all dementias and 5–8 for Alzheimer's disease, which means that half of new dementia cases each year are Alzheimer's disease. Advancing age is a primary risk factor for the disease and incidence rates are not equal for all ages: every 5 years after the age of 65, the risk of acquiring the disease approximately doubles, increasing from 3 to as much as 69 per thousand person years. Females with Alzheimer's disease are more common than males, but this difference is likely due to women's' longer life spans. When adjusted for age, both sexes are affected by Alzheimer's at equal rates.  In the United States, the risk of dying from Alzheimer's disease in 2010 was 26% higher among the non-Hispanic white population than among the non-Hispanic black population, and the Hispanic population had a 30% lower risk than the non-Hispanic white population. However, much Alzheimer's research remains to be done in minority groups, such as the African American and the Hispanic/Latino populations. Studies have shown that these groups are underrepresented in clinical trials and do not have the same risk of developing Alzheimer's when carrying certain genetic risk factors (i.e. APOE4), compared to their caucasian counterparts.

The prevalence of Alzheimer's disease in populations is dependent upon factors including incidence and survival. Since the incidence of Alzheimer's disease increases with age, prevalence depends on the mean age of the population for which prevalence is given. In the United States in 2020, Alzheimer's dementia prevalence was estimated to be 5.3% for those in the 60–74 age group, with the rate increasing to 13.8% in the 74–84 group and to 34.6% in those greater than 85. Prevalence rates in some less developed regions around the globe are lower. As the incidence and prevalence are steadily increasing, the prevalence itself is projected to triple by 2050. As of 2020, 50 million people globally have AD, with this number expected to increase to 152 million by 2050.

History

The ancient Greek and Roman philosophers and physicians associated old age with increasing dementia. It was not until 1901 that German psychiatrist Alois Alzheimer identified the first case of what became known as Alzheimer's disease, named after him, in a fifty-year-old woman he called Auguste D. He followed her case until she died in 1906 when he first reported publicly on it. During the next five years, eleven similar cases were reported in the medical literature, some of them already using the term Alzheimer's disease. The disease was first described as a distinctive disease by Emil Kraepelin after suppressing some of the clinical (delusions and hallucinations) and pathological features (arteriosclerotic changes) contained in the original report of Auguste D. He included Alzheimer's disease, also named presenile dementia by Kraepelin, as a subtype of senile dementia in the eighth edition of his Textbook of Psychiatry, published on  1910.

For most of the 20th century, the diagnosis of Alzheimer's disease was reserved for individuals between the ages of 45 and 65 who developed symptoms of dementia. The terminology changed after 1977 when a conference on Alzheimer's disease concluded that the clinical and pathological manifestations of presenile and senile dementia were almost identical, although the authors also added that this did not rule out the possibility that they had different causes. This eventually led to the diagnosis of Alzheimer's disease independent of age. The term senile dementia of the Alzheimer type (SDAT) was used for a time to describe the condition in those over 65, with classical Alzheimer's disease being used to describe those who were younger. Eventually, the term Alzheimer's disease was formally adopted in medical nomenclature to describe individuals of all ages with a characteristic common symptom pattern, disease course, and neuropathology.

The National Institute of Neurological and Communicative Disorders and Stroke (NINCDS) and the Alzheimer's Disease and Related Disorders Association (ADRDA, now known as the Alzheimer's Association) established the most commonly used NINCDS-ADRDA Alzheimer's Criteria for diagnosis in 1984, extensively updated in 2007. These criteria require that the presence of cognitive impairment, and a suspected dementia syndrome, be confirmed by neuropsychological testing for a clinical diagnosis of possible or probable Alzheimer's disease. A histopathologic confirmation including a microscopic examination of brain tissue is required for a definitive diagnosis. Good statistical reliability and validity have been shown between the diagnostic criteria and definitive histopathological confirmation.

Society and culture

Social costs
Dementia, and specifically Alzheimer's disease, may be among the most costly diseases for societies worldwide. As populations age, these costs will probably increase and become an important social problem and economic burden.  Costs associated with AD include direct and indirect medical costs, which vary between countries depending on social care for a person with AD. Direct costs include doctor visits, hospital care, medical treatments, nursing home care, specialized equipment, and household expenses. Indirect costs include the cost of informal care and the loss in productivity of informal caregivers.

In the United States , informal (family) care is estimated to constitute nearly three-fourths of caregiving for people with AD at a cost of  US$234 billion per year and approximately 18.5 billion hours of care. The cost to society worldwide to care for individuals with AD is projected to increase nearly ten-fold, and reach about US$9.1 trillion by 2050.

Costs for those with more severe dementia or behavioral disturbances are higher and are related to the additional caregiving time to provide physical care.

Caregiving burden

The role of the main caregiver is often taken by the spouse or a close relative. Alzheimer's disease is known for placing a great burden on caregivers which includes social, psychological, physical, or economic aspects. Home care is usually preferred by people with Alzheimer's disease and their families. This option also delays or eliminates the need for more professional and costly levels of care. Nevertheless, two-thirds of nursing home residents have dementias.

Dementia caregivers are subject to high rates of physical and mental disorders. Factors associated with greater psychosocial problems of the primary caregivers include having an affected person at home, the carer being a spouse, demanding behaviors of the cared person such as depression, behavioral disturbances, hallucinations, sleep problems or walking disruptions and social isolation. Regarding economic problems, family caregivers often give up time from work to spend 47 hours per week on average with the person with Alzheimer's disease, while the costs of caring for them are high. Direct and indirect costs of caring for somebody with Alzheimer's  average between $18,000 and $77,500 per year in the United States, depending on the study.

Cognitive behavioral therapy and the teaching of coping strategies either individually or in group have demonstrated their efficacy in improving caregivers' psychological health.

Media

Alzheimer's disease has been portrayed in films such as: Iris (2001), based on John Bayley's memoir of his wife Iris Murdoch; The Notebook (2004), based on Nicholas Sparks's 1996 novel of the same name; A Moment to Remember (2004); Thanmathra (2005); Memories of Tomorrow (Ashita no Kioku) (2006), based on Hiroshi Ogiwara's novel of the same name; Away from Her (2006), based on Alice Munro's short story The Bear Came over the Mountain; Still Alice (2014), about a Columbia University professor who has early onset Alzheimer's disease, based on Lisa Genova's 2007 novel of the same name and featuring Julianne Moore in the title role. Documentaries on Alzheimer's disease include Malcolm and Barbara: A Love Story (1999) and Malcolm and Barbara: Love's Farewell (2007), both featuring Malcolm Pointon.

Alzheimer's disease has also been portrayed in music by English musician the Caretaker in releases such as Persistent Repetition of Phrases (2008), An Empty Bliss Beyond This World (2011), and Everywhere at the End of Time (20162019). Paintings depicting the disorder include the late works by American artist William Utermohlen, who drew self-portraits from 1995 to 2000 as an experiment of showing his disease through art.

Research directions
Additional research on the lifestyle effect may provide insight into neuroimaging biomarkers and better understanding of the mechanisms causing both Alzheimer's disease and early-onset AD.

Emerging theories 
Alzheimer’s disease is associated with neuroinflammation and loss of function of microglia, the resident immune cells of the central nervous system. Microglia become progressively dysfunctional following exposure to amyloid plaques, and exposure to pro-inflammatory cytokines (e.g., TNFα, IL-1β, IL-12) has been hypothesized to sustain this dysfunction. Aberrant synaptic pruning via microglial phagocytosis may also contribute to AD pathology.The complement system, which is involved in some forms of typical microglial pruning during development, is implicated in animal models of AD by way of dysregulation of the activation (e.g. C1q; C3b) and terminal (e.g. MAC) pathways in synapses with proximity to amyloid plaques. [4]

Astrocytes may also contribute to AD pathology via their reactive states. Under typical conditions, astrocytes can surround amyloid beta plaques and can function to remove these species, which may be dysregulated under pathological conditions. Additionally, the activation of astrocytes following the release of APOE has been found to be vitally important in microglia function, especially in their ability to remove amyloid beta. In AD disease pathology, atrophy of astrocytes may prevent these functions, and further contribute to the prevalence of AD pathological species such as amyloid beta plaques.

Treatment and prevention
There is ongoing research examining the role of specific medications in reducing the prevalence (primary prevention) and/or progression (secondary prevention) of Alzheimer's disease. The research trials investigating medications generally impact Aβ plaques, inflammation, APOE, neurotransmitter receptors, neurogenesis, epigenetic regulators, growth factors and hormones. These studies have led to a better understanding of the disease, but none identified a prevention strategy. Experimental models are commonly used by researchers in order to understand disease mechanisms as well develop and test novel therapeutics aimed at treating Alzheimer's disease. 

Antibodies are being developed that may have the ability to alter the disease course by targeting amyloid beta, such as donanemab and aducanumab. Aducanumab was approved by the FDA in 2021, but its use and effectiveness remain unclear and controversial. Although it received FDA approval, aducanumab failed to show effectiveness in people who already had Alzheimer's symptoms.

References

Further reading

External links 

 
 
 

Alzheimer's disease
Aging-associated diseases
Ailments of unknown cause
Amyloidosis
Aphasias
Cognitive disorders
Dementia
Eponyms
Herpes simplex virus–associated diseases
Learning disabilities
Wikipedia neurology articles ready to translate
Unsolved problems in neuroscience
Wikipedia medicine articles ready to translate
Diseases named for discoverer